Ndubuisi ("Dele") Udo (24 May 1957 – July 1981) was a Nigerian sprinter. He was a collegiate champion at the University of Missouri in the 1970s and competed in the men's 400 metres at the 1980 Summer Olympics. He was shot dead in 1981, following an argument with a police officer in Lagos.

References

External links
 

1957 births
1981 deaths
Athletes (track and field) at the 1980 Summer Olympics
Nigerian male sprinters
Olympic athletes of Nigeria
African Games silver medalists for Nigeria
African Games medalists in athletics (track and field)
Deaths by firearm in Nigeria
Male murder victims
Athletes (track and field) at the 1978 All-Africa Games
People shot dead by law enforcement officers
People from Umuahia
20th-century Nigerian people